Amanahyphes is a genus of little stout crawler mayflies in the family Leptohyphidae. There are at least two described species in Amanahyphes.

Species
These two species belong to the genus Amanahyphes:
 Amanahyphes bahiensis
 Amanahyphes saguassu Salles & Molineri, 2006

References

Further reading

 
 

Mayflies
Articles created by Qbugbot